The Maserati Sebring was a two-door 2+2 coupé manufactured by Maserati from 1962 until 1968. Based on the Maserati 3500, the Sebring was aimed at the American Gran Turismo market and named after Maserati's 1957 racing victory at the 12 Hours of Sebring. A single two-seat spyder was built by Vignale in 1963 but did not enter production.

History

Series I
The Series I (Tipo AM 101/S) was shown at Salon International de l'Auto 1962 and again at the Salone dell'automobile di Torino in 1963. Employing all but the Maserati 3500's coachwork, it could reach  and 0–60 mph (97 km/h) in 8.5 seconds on 185x16 Pirelli Cinturato tyres. A Borg-Warner automatic transmission was available as an option,  When leaving the factory it originally fitted Pirelli Cinturato 205VR15 tyres (CN72). A total of 348 Series I Sebrings were built between 1962 and 1965. The 3700 engine first appeared in 1964, although only a handful of Series I cars were thus equipped.

Series II

In 1965, the modified Series II (Tipo AM 101/10) was introduced. It had lightly redesigned headlamps, modernized bumpers, new turn signals in front, and new side grilles replacing the lower extraction vents used hitherto. It took minor design cues from the contemporary Quattroporte. At the rear, aside from the squared off bumpers, the taillights were now mounted horizontally rather than vertically and the bootlid opening was narrowed somewhat. The Series II rode on larger 205x15 Pirelli Cinturatos. A run of 247 units were made from 1964 until 1968. Along with the 3500 engine, the 3700 (lengthened stroke which enlarged it to 3,694 cc (245 cubic inches)) and the even larger 4000 were added.

The 4000 GTiS has a 4,012 cc engine producing  at 5,200 rpm. It remained in production until 1968, when financial constraints forced Maserati to drop its older models from production.
It is believed that around 446 Sebrings were made in total from 1962 to 1969, with 348 units of the Sebring 3.5 and an estimated 98 of the 3.7 and 4.0 (combined). Anecdotal evidence related that according to the practice of marking interior panels and wood fitted pieces, the actual model number was only written in yellow grease marker on the rear surfaces of the interior bodywork. Evidence from assumed number 69 reveals parts with number “69 di 96” suggesting only 96 models were produced making them the rarest of the series 2 cars produced.

Jeremy Clarkson named the Sebring as #77 on his Top 100 Cars list.

References

External links

maserati-alfieri.co.uk on the Sebring (archived page)
deutschemaseraticlub.de offers a chassis number analysis
 offers a Maserati Sebring database
 Sebring - First series official website
 Sebring - Second Series official website

Sebring
Maserati Sebring
Maserati Sebring
Cars introduced in 1962